Suitcase 3: Up We Go Now is the third in a series of unreleased songs and instrumental sketches by the Dayton, Ohio band Guided By Voices, released on November 3, 2009 on GBV Inc. Like the previous two volumes, Suitcase 3 is a four-disc set containing 100 songs, 
many of which are credited to fake bands such as "Kelsey Boo Flip, Heartthrob Johnson Firestone, Erotic Zip Codes and the like." 
The fourth disc consists of impromptu acoustic jams recorded during 1994 and 1995.

Track listing
Fictitious band names shown in italics.

Disc 1: The Door Is Much Smaller, You See
Mr. Inspection Table - Building a Castle
Explosion Topic - Tired of Knocking
The Sobbers - Together/Apart
Remington Ash - Away with Driver
Demon Gods of Anger - Trash Truck
Manners of Flash - Dropping the Bomb
Remington Ash - What's So Safe About You
Limited Transplitter - Troopers in the Town
The Stools - Gas
C.C. Rip - Watch 'Em Diggin' Up the Road
Fate 1 Mile - Coastal Town
Watts - Escape from Kama Loka
Ben Franklin Air Bath - The Annex
Major Cockamamie - Green Ivory Cross
The Beautiful Orange Lemonade - Janet Wait
C.C. Rip - Independent Productions
Jubilant Toy Soldiers - Three White Flower
Pilthy May - Juggernaut vs. Monolith
The Perfect Nose Club - Feels Good
Video Bearhunt - Candy Machine
Dream Reaper - Air and Also a World
Gel Clay - Back to the Navy
The Governers - Speak Like Men
Kelsey Boo Flip - Hi, I'm Kelsey
Star of Hungry - No Trash Allowed

Disc 2: I Can't Think...Yeah
The Flattering Lights - Raphael Muzak
Service of a Bullet - Tear the Ticket in Half
Search - I'm an Acting Student
The Sums - I'll Come (and When It Does It's Mine)
East Dayton Rock Co. - Psycholophobia
East Dayton Rock Co. - Take Me Back
Bruce Smitty Smith - Sonny the Monster
Pilthy May - I Share a Rhythm
The Sobbers - Before My Eyes
Gavin Speaks - Freedom Rings
Hoof - Cochise
The Tallywackers - When's the Last Time
Remington Ash - That's Good
Pig Lucy - You Gotta Lotta Nerve
Mother's Day Haircut - Vagabond Lover
Fate 1 Mile - Banners
Looker - 100 Colors
Autobahn Damen - Old Engine Driver
Gel Clay - Joe
Cubscout Bowling Pins - Axtual Sectivity
The Working Girls - Call Me
Demon Gods of Anger - Believe It
Royal Canadien Mustard - Class Clown Spots a UFO
Remington Ash - You You You
10 Second Coma - Dibble

Disc 3: Thou Shall Read The Wheel
Bird Shit Mosaic - Night Ears
The Sobbers - Amnesia
Blaine Hazel - Fly Away (Tommy Sez)
Jubilant Toy Soldiers - Peace and Persecution
The Constant Rushing Forward - There Are Other Worlds
Knuckles And MacDougal - It's the Song
Erotic Zip Codes - One Code
Angel and The Alley Oops - Mainstay
John Shough - Sixland
Ghetto Tree - How Bridges Fall
Basic Switches - A Kind of Love
Naymoan Regas - Bad Whiskey
Curtis E. Flush - Naked Believer (I Am)
Heartless Microscopes - Out of the House
Equal in Coma - Grow
Psyclops - Rough Tracks
Gel Clay - Nothing So Hard
Bumble Gub - Piss Along You Bird
Gene Autrey's Psychic - 300 Birds (Quota)
The CDs - The Fire King Says No Cheating
Hearthrob Johnson Firestone - Poison Shop
The Worst Santini - Trader Vic
History of Well Hung Men - Smothered In Hugs (4-Track Version)
Aerial Poop Show - Dibble 2
Kid Biscuit - Huffman Prairie Flying Field

Disc 4: Tall Tale Moon (Antiquated) And Other Known Facts - Spontaneous Lo-Fly Field Recordings

Controlled Acoustic Jams 1994 • Between The Recordings Of Bee Thousand And Alien Lanes 
All credited to Guided By Voices
Pluto Is Polluted
Aquarian Hovercraft
Brand New Star
Sea-Mint Robots
South Rat Observatory
The Cinnamon Flavored Skull
Porpoise Mitten (Was a Real Good Kitten)
Mr. Spoon
Hey Mr. Soundman
Oh Pie
Kotex Moon
Bingo Pool Hall of Blood
There Goes the King Again
Evil Vandalia/Mojo Crew Zenith
Cuddling Bozo's Octopus
I Shot a Jezebel
After the Quake (Let's Bake a Cake)
P Melts Everything
My Dad Is a Motorboat
Ugly Ba Ba
Hairspray Lies
Sawhorse With Big Blue Ears
Tough Skin River
Cruise (demo)
Alright (demo)

References

Guided by Voices compilation albums
2009 compilation albums